Dilshod Sharofetdinov (born 15 October 1985) is an Uzbek footballer who plays as a midfielder for Indonesian Liga 1 club PSMS Medan.

Club career
Sharofetdinov has played for FK Samarqand-Dinamo, Navbahor and FC Pakhtakor Tashkent. During the 2009 AFC Champions League he played in all six games as Pakhtakor progressed to the Quarter Finals where they were defeated by Ittihad FC 5–1 on aggregate. During the 2011 AFC Champions League Sharofetdinov helped FC Pakhtakor Tashkent to a 2–2 over Al-Nassr in their opening round game. He got a major injury in 2016 after which his career slowed down.

On 13 March 2018, he signed a one-year contract with Liga 1 club PSMS Medan.

Career statistics

International career
Sharofetdinov has represented the Uzbekistan U-23s at the VTV-T&T Cup.

References

External links
 oleole profile
 

1985 births
Living people
Uzbekistani footballers
Uzbekistani expatriate footballers
Pakhtakor Tashkent FK players
Navbahor Namangan players
FK Dinamo Samarqand players
Expatriate footballers in Malaysia
Uzbekistani expatriate sportspeople in Malaysia
Sime Darby F.C. players
Terengganu F.C. II players
Expatriate footballers in Indonesia
Uzbekistani expatriate sportspeople in Indonesia
PSMS Medan players
Liga 1 (Indonesia) players
Malaysia Super League players
Association football midfielders